Thaumatomyia grata is a species of grass fly in the family Chloropidae.

References

Chloropinae
Articles created by Qbugbot
Insects described in 1863